If You Want to See Your Wife Again is a book written by John Craig and was originally published during 1971 by Cassell (now an imprint of the Octopus Publishing Group) which went on to win the Edgar's Book Jacket Award in 1972.

References 

Edgar Award-winning works
1971 Canadian novels
Cassell (publisher) books
Canadian thriller novels